The Leinster Senior League is the provincial cricket league within the Leinster jurisdiction in Ireland, which covers the province of Leinster in the Republic of Ireland. The league was formed in 1919, the nine founding members being Phoenix, Leinster, Pembroke, Dublin University, Railway Union, Civil Service, U.C.D., County Kildare and the Royal Hibernian Military School. The league is currently divided into twenty divisions, the top two (senior) divisions are designated as the Premier League and the Championship. The Championship includes two member clubs from the Munster province: Cork County and Cork Harlequins.

Teams play each other twice per season, once at home and once away, with league positions determined on the basis of percentage of points gained out of possible total points. 20 points awarded for a win, 12.5 for a tie, no points are awarded for “no result”, and up to five bonus points are awarded, depending on the margin of victory. Matches consist of one innings per side, with a maximum of fifty, and a minimum of twenty overs bowled per innings.

Members of senior divisions for 2022 season

Source: Cricket Leinster

List of champions

Performance by club

Summary of winners

See also
Leinster Senior Cup
Irish Senior Cup
NCU Senior League
North West Senior League

References

Cricket Leinster Archives
Cricket Leinster Archives

External links
 Cricket Leinster

 
Senior cricket leagues in Ireland
Cricket in Leinster
Sports leagues in Leinster
Sports leagues established in 1919
1919 establishments in Ireland